Asadullah Sumari (born 22 June 1986) is a Pakistani cricketer. He played in seventeen first-class and twelve List A matches between 2007 and 2015. He made his Twenty20 debut on 9 February 2014, for Islamabad Leopards in the 2013–14 National T20 Cup.

References

External links
 

1986 births
Living people
Pakistani cricketers
Islamabad cricketers
Islamabad Leopards cricketers
Place of birth missing (living people)